was the ninth of ten s built for the Imperial Japanese Navy in the mid-1930s under the Circle Two Supplementary Naval Expansion Program (Maru Ni Keikaku).

History
Kasumi was the ninth of ten Asashio-class destroyers built for the Imperial Japanese Navy.

The Asashio-class destroyers were larger and more capable that the preceding , as Japanese naval architects were no longer constrained by the provisions of the London Naval Treaty. These light cruiser-sized vessels were designed to take advantage of Japan’s lead in torpedo technology, and to accompany the Japanese main striking force and in both day and night attacks against the United States Navy as it advanced across the Pacific Ocean, according to Japanese naval strategic projections. Despite being one of the most powerful classes of destroyers in the world at the time of their completion, none survived the Pacific War.

Kasumi, built at the Uraga Dock Company, was laid down on 1 December 1936, launched on 18 November 1937 and commissioned on 28 June 1939. On completion, she was assigned to the IJN 2nd Fleet as part of Desdiv 18, Desron 2 under command of Commander Kiyoshi Tomura.

Operational history
At the time of the attack on Pearl Harbor, Kasumi was based at Etorofu in the Kurile Islands, and sailed as part of the escort for Admiral Nagumo’s Carrier Strike Force, guarding the fleet tankers accompanying the strike force. She returned to Kure on 24 December.

In February she sortied from Palau to cover the air strike on Darwin, and was based from Staring-baai in Sulawesi, Netherlands East Indies from 21 February. At the end of the month, she was making patrols south of Java, sinking a merchant vessel on 1 March. Kasumi departed Staring-baai on 27 March to escort the carrier force in the Indian Ocean raid on 27 March  After the Japanese air strikes on Colombo and Trincomalee in Ceylon, she returned to Kure for repairs on 23 April. Kasumi deployed from Saipan on 3 June as part of the escort for the troop convoy in the Battle of Midway. On 28 June, she was assigned to escort the aircraft carrier  to Kiska in the Aleutian Islands on a supply mission. She remained under repairs in Japan until 30 June 1943.

On 1 September 1943, as part of Desdiv 9, Desron 1 of the IJN 5th Fleet, Kasumi was reassigned to northern waters, making patrols from her base at Paramushiro and Shumushu until the end of November. In December, she made a transport run to convey replacement aircrews from Yokosuka to Kwajalein and Wotje, returning with the cruiser  to Maizuru. While at Maizuru for refit though 18 January 1944, her X-turret was removed and replaced by additional two triple Type 96 25mm AA guns.

During the Battle of Leyte Gulf from 24–25 October, she was assigned to Admiral Shima’s force in the Battle of Surigao Strait. On 5 November, she rescued survivors of Nachi in Manila Bay following an American air raid. She escorted a troop convoy to Ormoc on 5 November, and was damaged by strafing in another American air raid later that month, which killed one crewman. At the end of November, she escorted the battleship  from Singapore to Mako, and a convoy from Mako to Cam Ranh Bay in French Indochina in December. In late December, she led a force in the bombardment of San Jose in the Philippines.

She was reassigned to the IJN 2nd Fleet on 10 March.

On 6 April 1945, Kasumi was part of the escort for the final mission of the battleship . Coming under attack by aircraft from Task Force 58 on 7 April, she lost steering control, and suffered 17 dead and 47 injured. She was removed from the navy list on 10 May 1945.

See also 
 Operation Kita
 List of ships of the Japanese Navy

Notes

References

External links
 CombinedFleet.com: Asashio-class destroyers
 CombinedFleet.com: Kasumi history
GlobalSecurity.org: Asashio class destroyers

Asashio-class destroyers
Ships built by Uraga Dock Company
World War II destroyers of Japan
Ships of the Aleutian Islands campaign
1937 ships
Maritime incidents in April 1945
Shipwrecks in the East China Sea